New Zealand heraldry is the term for the style of armorial achievements, sometimes known as coats of arms, and other heraldic bearings and insignia used in New Zealand. It largely follows the Gallo-British tradition of heraldry also followed in England, Scotland, Ireland, Canada and Australia.

Most grants of heraldic arms to New Zealand residents or institutions have been made by the English College of Arms or the Scottish Court of the Lord Lyon, though a small number have also been granted by the Chief Herald of Ireland and the State Herald of South Africa.

Heraldic authority 
New Zealand does not presently have its own independent heraldic authority which grants or records arms, though the College of Arms in London claims to be "the official heraldic authority for...New Zealand". According to the guidelines of the Cabinet Manual, the College has been delegated these responsibilities by the Sovereign of New Zealand in their capacity as the "Fount of all Honour". However, the legal basis for this "official" status for the College of Arms is disputed.

On 6 February 1978 Queen Elizabeth II established the New Zealand Herald of Arms Extraordinary as the officer of arms responsible for advising the Crown, New Zealand government and New Zealand Defence Force on heraldic matters, and for liaising between New Zealand and the English College of Arms. Although affiliated with the College of Arms, the New Zealand Herald of Arms Extraordinary lives and works in New Zealand, and is not a member of the College Chapter. The current New Zealand Herald of Arms Extraordinary is Phillip Patrick O’Shea.

Coats of arms 
The heraldry of New Zealand has added indigenous animals (mostly birds) to the existing heraldic bestiary, along with native flora and traditional Māori motifs.

National arms

Civic arms
Some, but not all, local authorities in New Zealand use heraldic arms. The arms of the capital, Wellington, combines the arms of Aurthur Wellesley, 1st Duke of Wellington with the national coat of arms. The coat of arms of the City of Christchurch also have charges from the national arms. Auckland, the largest city in New Zealand, does not currently use any arms.

The unauthorised use of a coat of arms of a local authority can be an offense.

Arms of former local authorities

Personal arms

Corporate/Institutional arms
Some New Zealand corporations and institutions have their own coats-of-arms, including several New Zealand universities such as University of Auckland, Massey University, the University of Waikato, and the University of Otago.

Ecclesiastical arms

Badges and crests

Heraldry of the Cook Islands, Niue and Tokelau
The other countries of the Realm of New Zealand, the associated states of the Cook Islands and Niue and the dependent territory of Tokelau, have their own heraldic emblems. The Cook Islands has their own armorial bearings (coat of arms) using unique local elements, since 2021 Niue has had a seal based on traditional Niuean elements (replacing their previous one based on the New Zealand coat of arms), while Tokelau has a badge based on a traditional Tokelauan tuluma.

Heraldists 
Heraldry is also discussed and studied by The Heraldry Society of New Zealand, a learned society under the patronage of the governor-general. The society publishes The New Zealand Armorist. Its homepage is called Onward.

References

External Links

Onward - The Heraldry Society of New Zealand Inc.
The College of Arms
Official Website of the Herald of Arms Extraordinary (New Zealand Government)
Cabinet Manual, on heraldry
New Zealand Heraldry on Heraldry of the World
Cook Island Heraldry on Heraldry of the World
Niuean Heraldry on Heraldry of the World
Tokelauan Heraldry on Heraldry of the World

New Zealand heraldry
New Zealand culture
Heraldry by country